Settimo Torinese is a comune in the Metropolitan City of Turin, in Piedmont, Italy. The name settimo means "seventh", and it comes from the comune's distance from Turin, which is seven Roman miles. It is bordered by the other comuni of Leinì, Mappano, Volpiano, Brandizzo, San Mauro Torinese, Gassino Torinese, Castiglione Torinese, and Turin.

Sights include the Tower of Settimo, the last remains of the medieval castle (13th–14th centuries) mostly destroyed in the 16th century wars.

Twin cities
 Cavarzere, Italy
 Chaville, France
 Valls, Spain

References